Global terrestrial stilling is the decrease of wind speed observed near the Earth's surface (~10-meter height) over the last three decades (mainly since the 1980s), originally termed "stilling". This slowdown of near-surface terrestrial winds has mainly affected mid-latitude regions of both hemispheres, with a global average reduction of −0.140 m s−1 dec−1 (meters per second per decade) or between 5 and 15% over the past 50 years. With high-latitude (> 75° from the equator) showing increases in both hemispheres. In contrast to the observed weakening of winds over continental surfaces, winds have tended to strengthen over ocean regions. In the last few years, a break in this terrestrial decrease of wind speed has been detected suggesting a recovery at global scales since 2013.

The exact cause(s) of the global terrestrial stilling are uncertain and has been mainly attributed to two major drivers: (i) changes in large scale atmospheric circulation, and (ii) an increase of surface roughness due to e.g. forest growth, land use changes, and urbanization. 

Given climate change, changes in wind speed are currently a potential concern for society, due to their impacts on a wide array of spheres, such as wind power generation, ecohydrological implications for agriculture and hydrology, wind-related hazards and catastrophes, or air quality and human health, among many others.

Causes

The attribution of this weakening of terrestrial near-surface wind speed is not conclusive, probably because of several factors which interact simultaneously, and may change in space in time. Scientists have pointed out various major causes influencing this slowdown in wind speed:

(i) The increase in land-surface roughness (e.g. forest growth, land use changes and urbanization) near meteorological station where anemometer instruments measure wind lead to a reinforcement of friction force that weaken low-level winds.

(ii) The variability of large-scale atmospheric circulation, associated with the poleward expansion of the Hadley cell and the shifting of centers of action (i.e. anticyclones and cyclones) controlling changes in near-surface wind speed.

(iii) The changes in how wind speed is measured, including the deterioration or instrumental drift of anemometer devices; the technological improvement of anemometers; anemometer height changes; shifts in measurements sites; changes in the environment around the monitoring station; calibration issues; and measuring time intervals.

(iv) The "global dimming", i.e., the decrease in the amounts of solar radiation reaching the Earth's surface due to increased aerosol and greenhouse gas concentrations, forces a stabilization of the atmosphere resulting in weak winds.

(v) Other causes, such as increasing trends in available soil moisture and astronomical changes have been put forward.

However, the exact causes of global terrestrial stilling are still unresolved because of the many uncertainties behind this phenomenon across the world.

Uncertainties

The "global terrestrial stilling" is not affecting in the same way the whole Earth's surface across both land and ocean surfaces. Spatially, increasing wind speed trends have been reported for some regions, in particular for high-latitudes, coastal and for ocean surfaces where different authors have evidenced an increased global trend of wind speed using satellite measurements in the last 30–40 years. Recent studies have shown a break in the negative tendency of terrestrial wind speeds, with a recent widespread recovery / strengthening of wind speed since around 2013. This creates uncertainty in understanding the phenomenon.

Most of the uncertainties behind the "global terrestrial stilling" debate resides in (i) the short wind speed data availability, with series starting in the 1960s, (ii) wind speed studies mainly carried on midlatitude regions where the majority of long-term measurements are available; and (iii) the low quality of anemometer records as pointed out by the Fifth Assessment Report (AR5) of the Intergovernmental Panel on Climate Change (IPCC).

The low quality in wind speed series is mainly due to non-climatic factors (e.g. observing practice changes, station relocation, anemometer height changes) affecting those records, which result to be unrepresentative of the actual wind speed variations over time. Specific homogenization protocols for wind speed series have been developed in order to detect and adjust potential inhomogeneities.

Ongoing research

The current research on assessing and attributing this phenomenon has focused on reducing the limitation of short availability and low quality of wind speed data. The European funded research project STILLING is a current (2016–2018) initiative that aims to reduce this constraint by rescuing, homogenizing and recovering the longest and highest-quality wind speed series across the globe. The project is currently compiling wind speed records starting in the 1880s providing scientists with approximately 130-year records, roughly 80 years more than previous studies available in the scientific literature. The better knowledge of the past wind speed climate is crucial for understanding the present "global terrestrial stilling" phenomenon, detecting if climate change is behind this slowdown of wind or similar trends-cycles occurred in the past and could be expected for the future. That is with longer records decadal cycles may be detected.

Implications of wind speed changes

The "global terrestrial stilling" phenomenon is of great scientific, socioeconomic, and environmental interest because of the key impact of even small wind speed changes on atmospheric and ocean dynamics and related fields such as: (i) renewable wind energy; (ii) agriculture and hydrology due to evapotranspiration; (iii) migration of wind-dispersed plant species; (iv) wind-related natural disasters; (v) marine and coastal impacts due to wind-driven storm surges and waves; (vi) dispersion of air pollutants; among many other socioeconomic and environmental spheres. However, for wind energy near-surface wind speeds are mainly observed within 10m of the land surface, and with turbines being located some 60–80 m above the land surface more studies are needed here.  More studies are also needed at higher elevation sites, which are often areas that yield much of our freshwater supplies, called water-towers, as wind speeds there have been shown to be decreasing more rapidly than those changes recorded at lower elevation sites, and there are several Chinese papers showing this for the Tibet Plateau.

References

Climate change